Subclade may be
Subclade, any taxonomic  clade which is subordinate to hierarchically higher clades, especially:
Subclade, a subgroup of a  clade 
Subclade, a subgroup of a genetic haplogroup
 a subgroup of a human mitochondrial DNA haplogroup
 a subgroup of a  human Y-chromosome DNA haplogroup

See also 
Cladistics